The Puerta de Bisagra (originally Bab al-Saqra, also called Puerta de Alfonso VI) is a city gate of Toledo, Spain.

The structure was constructed in the 10th century, in the time of the Moorish Taifa of Toledo in Islamic Al-Andalus. It is also called 'Bisagra Antigua' to distinguish it from the Puerta de Bisagra Nueva which was built in 1559. The gate was the main entrance to the city and dates from the Moorish period.

See also

References
Clara Delgado Valero, Regreso a tulaytula: Guía del Toledo islámico: siglos VIII-XI, ed. Junta de Comunidades de Castilla-La Mancha, 1999, p. 133-4

External links
Museum With No Frontiers (MWNF): Puerta de Bisagra webpage 
Oronoz.com: Photos of Puerta de Bisagra 
Archnet.org: "Arrabal Quarter and Puerta Bisagra"
Visitclm.com: Castilla-La Mancha, Discover and Feel—Puerta de Bisagra

Gates in Toledo, Spain
Buildings and structures completed in the 10th century
10th century in Al-Andalus
Moorish architecture in Spain